Index Point is a low, ice-covered point that forms the eastern extremity of the Mountaineer Range on the coast of Victoria Land, Antarctica. It was so named in 1966 by the New Zealand Antarctic Place-Names Committee because the shape is suggestive of an index finger.

References

Headlands of Victoria Land
Borchgrevink Coast